Shilihe may refer to the following places in the People's Republic of China:

 Shilihe Station, Beijing Subway
 Shilihe Town, Sujiatun District, Shenyang, Liaoning Province